Siegersdorf bei Herberstein is a former municipality in the district of Hartberg-Fürstenfeld in Styria, Austria. Since 2015, it is part of the municipality Feistritztal.

References

Cities and towns in Hartberg-Fürstenfeld District